Mai Kragballe Nielsen (born 15 December 1997) is a Danish handball player who currently plays for IK Sävehof.

References
 

1997 births
Living people
Handball players from Copenhagen
Danish female handball players